Lophoptera triangulata is a moth of the family Noctuidae. It was first described by Emilio Berio in 1973 from a holotype found in Kambaiti, Myanmar.

References

External links
 Swedish Museum of Natural History - pictures of the holotype

Stictopterinae
Moths described in 1973